Francisco "Patxi" Gamborena Hernandorena (14 March 1901 – 30 July 1982), was a Spanish footballer who played as a midfielder.

He spent his entire club career from 1915 to 1934 with Real Unión in his hometown of Irún in the Basque Country, winning the Copa del Rey in 1924 and 1927 before playing in the club's four seasons in La Liga after its formation, followed by two in the Segunda División after relegation (they never returned to the top level).

Gamborena made his international debut for Spain on 9 October 1921 in a 2–0 home friendly win over Belgium in Bilbao's Estadio San Mamés. He played 20 internationals, including at the 1924 and 1928 Olympic tournaments, and his last match was a 13–0 win over Bulgaria on 21 May 1933, Spain's record victory.

After his retirement, he had brief spells in management at six Spanish clubs between 1939 and 1950.

Honours
Copa del Rey: 1924, 1927

References

External links
 
 

1901 births
1982 deaths
Sportspeople from Irun
Association football midfielders
Spanish footballers
Footballers from the Basque Country (autonomous community)
Spain international footballers
Olympic footballers of Spain
Real Unión footballers
Footballers at the 1924 Summer Olympics
Footballers at the 1928 Summer Olympics
Basque Country international footballers
Spanish football managers
La Liga managers
Segunda División managers
Tercera División managers
Hércules CF managers
Deportivo Alavés managers
Real Zaragoza managers
Real Sociedad managers
Xerez CD managers
Real Oviedo managers
Real Jaén managers